The Iglesia San Sebastián Mártir in the plaza in San Sebastián, Puerto Rico was completed in 1897 and listed on the U.S. National Register of Historic Places in 1984.

It is one of five churches designed by state architect Pedro Cobreros during 1890 to 1896 and completed in 1897 and is "austere, yet noble".

It is one of 31 churches reviewed for listing on the National Register in 1984.

References

San Sebastián, Puerto Rico
Churches completed in 1897
19th-century Roman Catholic church buildings in the United States
Churches on the National Register of Historic Places in Puerto Rico